Scythris sacharissa is a moth of the family Scythrididae. It was described by Edward Meyrick in 1913. It is found in South Africa.

The wingspan is about 13 mm. The forewings are rather dark grey with a broad rosy-ochreous-whitish median longitudinal streak from the base to the termen, emitting a fine line beneath from beyond its middle. The veins on the costal area above this are marked by fine rosy-ochreous-whitish lines and there are similar indistinct dorsal 
and subdorsal lines, confluent towards the base, but becoming obsolete posteriorly. The hindwings are rather dark grey, darker posteriorly.

References

Endemic moths of South Africa
sacharissa
Moths described in 1913